The Office of the Attorney General of Colombia (literally "General Prosecutorial Office of the Nation") is the Colombian institution part of the Colombian judicial branch of Government with administrative autonomy designed to prosecute offenders, investigate crimes, review judicial processes and accuse penal law infractions against  judges and courts of justice. The Office of the Attorney General was created by the Colombian Constitution of 1991 and began operating on July 1, 1992. The current attorney general is Fernando Carrillo.

An investigative process is initiated either by the institutions' own initiative or after a denouncer has made authorities aware of the case in a police station or in a Quick Reaction Unit of the Attorney General's Office.

Attorney General

Election process
The attorney general is elected by Colombian Supreme Court out of a ternary presented by the president for a period of four years. To cast the final vote, the Supreme Court of Justice must meet a quorum of 16 out of the possible 23 votes, i.e. two thirds of the votes.

List of attorneys general

Controversies
Former attorney general Luis Camilo Osorio, whose four-year term ran from 2001 to 2005, was criticized by Human Rights Watch. They accused him of undermining investigations into human rights violations by retiring or forcing the resignation of several investigators.

References

Judiciary of Colombia

Government agencies established in 1991
1991 establishments in Colombia